The 1985 Austrian Grand Prix was a Formula One motor race held at Österreichring on 18 August 1985. It was the tenth race of the 1985 Formula One World Championship. It was the 25th Austrian Grand Prix and the 24th to be held at Österreichring.

The race was won by Frenchman Alain Prost, driving a McLaren-TAG, after he started from pole position. Prost took his fourth victory of the season by 30 seconds from Brazilian Ayrton Senna in a Lotus-Renault, with Italian Michele Alboreto third in a Ferrari. With the win, Prost moved level on points with Alboreto at the top of the Drivers' Championship.

Race summary 
Missing from the grid was RAM driver Manfred Winkelhock who had been killed in a sportscar race in Canada just a week before. His place was taken in the team by Kenny Acheson for his first Formula One race since the 1983 South African Grand Prix.

A second Toleman was driven by Piercarlo Ghinzani.

Before Saturday morning practice triple and defending World Champion (and 1984 Austrian Grand Prix winner) Niki Lauda, flanked by a very unhappy McLaren team boss Ron Dennis, announced to the media that he would be retiring for good from Formula One following the season ending  to concentrate on running his airline Lauda Air.

A now relaxed Lauda gave his home fans something to cheer about when he qualified a season-high third. Lauda's team mate Alain Prost captured pole position, averaging 155.478 mph (250.219 km/h), followed by Nigel Mansell (Williams-Honda), Lauda, Keke Rosberg (Williams) and Nelson Piquet (Brabham-BMW). After a troubled qualifying, Ayrton Senna only qualified 14th on the grid in his Lotus-Renault.

The race was restarted after one lap (with Niki Lauda having made a great start from third on the grid to lead Prost as the race was stopped). Mansell had got away very slowly in his Williams, but behind him Teo Fabi in the Toleman-Hart barely moved. Elio de Angelis' Lotus dived left to avoid Fabi and was hit by the Ferrari of Michele Alboreto. Fabi suffered damage as did the Arrows-BMW of the second Austrian driver in the race Gerhard Berger. Luckily for those with damaged cars (especially championship leader Alboreto) the first lap was declared null and void and the race was completely restarted meaning those with damaged cars were permitted to start in the team spares. Lucky too was Prost who was able to change cars after his McLaren had developed a misfire. Piercarlo Ghinzani became a non-starter in his Toleman after team mate Fabi took over the spare TG185 for the race as he had qualified 6th while Ghinzani started 19th. This left Ghinzani without a drive.

On lap 13 Andrea de Cesaris survived one of the biggest crashes ever seen in Formula One when his Ligier-Renault turned sideways at the left hand Panorama Curve and slid onto the outside grass at high speed. The grass, wet from overnight rain caused the Ligier to initially slide sideways before his right rear hit a slight bank launching the car into a series of rolls with de Cesaris's head bouncing around freely in the cockpit. Somehow as soon as the Ligier came to a rest, de Cesaris undid his seat belt and walked away with nothing more than a mud-splattered helmet and driving suit. When he returned to the pits, the Ligier team had not yet seen a replay of the accident, and de Cesaris told the team that the car had stalled and wouldn't restart.

With his 20th career victory, Prost moved into a shared lead in the World Drivers' Championship alongside Alboreto, with each having 50 points. After a string of non-finishes since his win in the second race of the season in Portugal, Senna drove a great race into second from a lowly (for him) 14th on the grid, with Alboreto finishing third in the spare Ferrari to retain his lead in the World Championship (now shared with Prost). Stefan Johansson (Ferrari), Elio de Angelis, and Marc Surer (Brabham), completed the points-scoring finishers.

Classification

Qualifying

Race

Championship standings after the race 

Drivers' Championship standings

Constructors' Championship standings

References

Austrian Grand Prix
Grand Prix
Austrian Grand Prix
Austrian Grand Prix